Ezra or Esdras (fl. 480–440 BCE), also called Ezra the Scribe and Ezra the Priest in the Book of Ezra, was a Jewish scribe (sofer) and priest (kohen). In Greco-Latin Ezra is called Esdras. According to the Hebrew Bible he was a descendant of Sraya, the last High Priest to serve in Solomon's Temple, and a close relative of Joshua, the first High Priest of the Second Temple. He returned from Babylonian exile and reintroduced the Torah in Jerusalem. According to 1 Esdras, a Greek translation of the Book of Ezra still in use in Eastern Orthodox Church, he was also a High Priest. Rabbinic tradition holds that he was an ordinary member of the priesthood.

Several traditions have developed over his place of burial. One tradition says that he is buried in al-Uzayr near Basra (Iraq), while another tradition alleges that he is buried in Tadif near Aleppo, in northern Syria.

According to Josephus, Ezra died and was buried "in a magnificent manner in Jerusalem."

In the Greek Septuagint the name is rendered , from which the Latin name  comes.

The Book of Ezra describes how he led a group of Judean exiles living in Babylon to their home city of Jerusalem where he is said to have enforced observance of the Torah. He was described as exhorting the Israelite people to be sure to follow the Torah Law so as not to intermarry with people of particular different religions, a set of commandments described in the Pentateuch.

Ezra, known as "Ezra the scribe" in Chazalic literature, is a highly respected figure in Judaism.

In the Hebrew Bible
The canonical Book of Ezra and Book of Nehemiah are the oldest sources for the activity of Ezra, whereas many of the other books ascribed to Ezra (First Esdras, 3–6 Ezra) are later literary works dependent on the canonical books of Ezra and Nehemiah.

The book of Ezra–Nehemiah was always written as one scroll. In late medieval Christian bibles, the single book was divided in two, as First and Second Ezra; and this division became Jewish practice in the first printed Hebrew bibles. Modern Hebrew Bibles call the two books Ezra and Nehemiah, as do other modern Bible translations. A few parts of the Book of Ezra (4:8 to 6:18 and 7:12–26) were written in Aramaic, and the majority in Hebrew, Ezra himself being skilled in both languages.

Ezra was living in Babylon when in the seventh year of Artaxerxes I, the Achaemenid emperor (c. 457 BCE), the emperor sent him to Jerusalem to teach the laws of God to any who did not know them. Ezra led a large body of exiles back to Jerusalem, where he discovered that Jewish men had been marrying non-Jewish women. He tore his garments in despair and confessed the sins of Israel before God, then braved the opposition of some of his own countrymen to purify the community by enforcing the dissolution of the sinful marriages. Some years later Artaxerxes sent Nehemiah (a Jewish noble in his personal service) to Jerusalem as governor with the task of rebuilding the city walls. Once this task was completed Nehemiah had Ezra read the Torah to the assembled Israelites, and the people and priests entered into a covenant to keep the law and separate themselves from all other peoples.

In later Second Temple period literature

1 Esdras
1 Esdras, probably from the late 2nd/early 1st centuries BCE, preserves a Greek text of Ezra and a part of Nehemiah distinctly different from that of Ezra–Nehemiah – in particular it eliminates Nehemiah from the story and gives some of his deeds to Ezra, as well as telling events in a different order. Scholars are divided on whether it is based on Ezra–Nehemiah, or reflects an earlier literary stage before the combination of Ezra and Nehemiah accounts.

Josephus
The first-century Jewish historian Josephus deals with Ezra in his Antiquities of the Jews. He uses the name Xerxes for Artaxerxes I reserving the name Artaxerxes for the later Artaxerxes II whom he identifies as the Ahasuerus of Esther, thus placing Ezra before the events of the book of Esther. Josephus' account of the deeds of Ezra derives entirely from 1 Esdras, which he cites as the 'Book of Ezra' in his numeration of the Hebrew bible. Contrariwise, Josephus does not appear to recognise Ezra-Nehemiah as a biblical book, does not quote from it, and relies entirely on other traditions in his account of the deeds of Nehemiah.

The apocalyptic Ezra traditions
The apocalyptic fourth book of Ezra (also sometimes called the 'second book of Esdras' or the 'third book of Esdras') was written c. CE 100, probably in Judeo-Aramaic, but now survives in Latin, Slavonic and Ethiopic. In this book, Ezra has a seven part prophetic revelation, converses with an angel of God three times and has four visions. Ezra, thirty years into the Babylonian Exile (4 Ezra 3:1 / 2 Esdras 1:1), recounts the siege of Jerusalem and the destruction of Solomon's Temple.  The central theological themes are "the question of theodicy, God's justness in the face of the triumph of the heathens over the pious, the course of world history in terms of the teaching of the four kingdoms, the function of the law, the eschatological judgment, the appearance on Earth of the heavenly Jerusalem, the Messianic Period, at the end of which the Messiah will die, the end of this world and the coming of the next, and the Last Judgment." Ezra restores the law that was destroyed with the burning of the Temple in Jerusalem. He dictates 24 books for the public (i.e. the Hebrew Bible) and another 70 for the wise alone (70 unnamed revelatory works). At the end, he is taken up to heaven like Enoch and Elijah. Ezra is seen as a new Moses in this book.

There is also another work, thought to be influenced by this one, known as the Greek Apocalypse of Ezra.

In rabbinic literature

Traditionally Judaism credits Ezra with establishing the Great Assembly of scholars and prophets, the forerunner of the Sanhedrin, as the authority on matters of religious law. The Great Assembly is credited with establishing numerous features of contemporary traditional Judaism in something like their present form, including Torah reading, the Amidah, and celebration of the feast of Purim.

In Rabbinic traditions, Ezra is metaphorically referred to as the "flowers that appear on the earth" signifying the springtime in the national history of Judaism. A disciple of Baruch ben Neriah, he favored study of the Law over the reconstruction of the Temple  and thus because of his studies, he did not join the first party returning to Jerusalem in the reign of Cyrus. According to another opinion, he did not join the first party so as not to compete, even involuntarily, with Jeshua ben Jozadak for the office of chief priest.

According to Jewish tradition, Ezra was the writer of the Books of Chronicles, and is the same prophet known also as Malachi. There is a slight controversy within rabbinic sources as to whether or not Ezra had served as High Priest of Israel.

According to the Babylonian Talmud, Ezra the scribe is said to have enacted ten standing laws and orders, which are as follows:
 That the public come together to read from the sefer Torah on Shabbatot during the time of the afternoon oblation (Minchah), because of those travelling merchants who loiter in the closed shops in the street corners, and who may have missed the biblical lections that were read during the weekdays 
 That the courts be opened throughout the Jewish townships on Mondays and Thursdays
 That women would not wait beyond Thursday to launder their clothes, because of the honor due to the Sabbath day
 That men would accustom themselves to eat [cooked] garlic on the eve of the Sabbath (believed to enhance love between a man and his wife)
 That women would rise up early on Friday mornings to bake bread, so that a piece of bread would be available for the poor
 That Jewish women in every place be girded with a wide belt (waist band), whether from the front or from behind, out of modesty
 That Jewish women, during their menses, wash and comb their hair three days prior to their purification in a ritual bath
 That the traveling merchants make regular rounds into the Jewish townships because of the honor due to the daughters of Israel
 That Jewish women and/or girls, as a precautionary measure, be accustomed to conversing with one another while one of their party goes out to relieve herself in the outhouse
 That men who may have suffered a seminal emission (especially after accompanying with their wives) be required to immerse themselves in a mikveh before being permitted to read from the scroll of the Law

In the Syrian village of Tedef, a synagogue said to be the place where Ezra stopped over has been venerated by Jews for centuries. Another tradition locates his tomb near Basra, Iraq.

In Christian traditions
Early Christian writers occasionally cited Ezra as author of the apocalyptic books attributed to him. Clement of Alexandria in his Stromata referred to Ezra as an example of prophetic inspiration, quoting a section from 2 Esdras. Where early Christian writers refer to the 'Book of Ezra' it is always the text of 1 Esdras that is being cited.  No early Christian writer cites the Book of Ezra as a record of the deeds of Ezra.

In Islam

In Islam, he is known as Uzair. He was mentioned in the Qur'an. Although he was not mentioned as one of the Prophets of Islam, he is considered one of them by some Muslim scholars, based on Islamic traditions. His tomb at Al-ʻUzer on the banks of the Tigris near Basra, Iraq, is a pilgrimage site for the local Marsh Arabs. Many Islamic scholars and modern Western academics do not view Uzer as "Ezra"; for example, Professor Gordon Darnell Newby associates Uzer with Enoch and Metatron.

Academic view

Timeline 
Scholars are divided over the chronological sequence of the activities of Ezra and Nehemiah. Ezra came to Jerusalem "in the seventh year of Artaxerxes the King". The text does not specify whether the king in the passage refers to Artaxerxes I (465–424 BCE) or to Artaxerxes II (404–359 BCE). Most scholars hold that Ezra lived during the rule of Artaxerxes I, though some have difficulties with this assumption: Nehemiah and Ezra "seem to have no knowledge of each other; their missions do not overlap", however, in Nehemiah 12, both are leading processions on the wall as part of the wall dedication ceremony.  So, they clearly were contemporaries working together in Jerusalem at the time the wall and the city of Jerusalem was rebuilt in contrast to the previously stated viewpoint.;." These difficulties have led many scholars to assume that Ezra arrived in the seventh year of the rule of Artaxerxes II, i.e. some 50 years after Nehemiah. This assumption would imply that the biblical account is not chronological. The last group of scholars regard "the seventh year" as a scribal error and hold that the two men were contemporaries.

Historicity 

Mary Joan Winn Leith in The Oxford History of the Biblical World believes that Ezra was a historical figure whose life was enhanced in the scripture and given a theological buildup. Gosta W. Ahlstrom argues the inconsistencies of the biblical tradition are insufficient to say that Ezra, with his central position as the 'father of Judaism' in the Jewish tradition, has been a later literary invention. Those who argue against the historicity of Ezra argue that the presentation style of Ezra as a leader and lawgiver resembles that of Moses. There are also similarities between Ezra the priest-scribe (but not high priest) and Nehemiah the secular governor on the one hand and Joshua and Zerubbabel on the other hand. The early 2nd-century BCE Jewish author Ben Sira praises Nehemiah, but makes no mention of Ezra.

Richard Friedman argues in his book Who Wrote the Bible? that Ezra is the one who redacted the Torah, and in fact effectively produced the first Torah. It has been argued that even if one does not accept the documentary hypothesis, Ezra was instrumental in the start of the process of bringing the Torah together.

One particular aspect of Ezra's story considered dubious historically is the account in Ezra 7 of his commission.  According to it, Ezra was given truly exalted status by the king: he was seemingly put in charge of the entire western half of the Persian Empire, a position apparently above even the level of the satraps (regional governors).  Ezra was given vast hordes of treasure to take with him to Jerusalem as well as a letter where the king seemingly acknowledges the sovereignty of the God of Israel.  Yet, his actions in the story do not appear to be that of someone with near unlimited government power, and the alleged letter from a Persian king is written with Hebraisms and Jewish idiom.

See also
Esdras – about the classification of the books ascribed to Ezra
Ezra (name)
Book of Ezra and Book of Nehemiah – the non-rabbinical tradition
Ezra–Nehemiah – the combination of the above two books
1 Esdras and 2 Esdras – the Greek version of the texts (Meir)

References

Further reading

External links 

 Jewish Encyclopedia: Ezra the Scribe
 Catholic Encyclopedia: Esdras
 

Hebrew Bible people
Jewish scribes (soferim)
Jewish priests
Ezra–Nehemiah
Ancient Near Eastern scribes
Angelic visionaries
Founders of religions
Tribe of Levi
People from the Achaemenid Empire
5th-century BCE Jews
People whose existence is disputed